Al-Jabbul is a Syrian village in the Aleppo Governorate to the north of Sabkhat al-Jabbul. The old city of Gabula used to host the Monastery of St. Isaac.

References

Cities in Syria
Populated places in Dayr Hafir District